Mathabhanga subdivision is a subdivision of the Cooch Behar district in the state of West Bengal, India.

Subdivisions
Cooch Behar district is divided into the following administrative subdivisions:

Administrative units
Mathabhanga subdivision has 3 police stations, 3 community development blocks, 3 panchayat samitis, 28 gram panchayats, 265 mouzas, 260 inhabited villages and 1 municipality. The municipality is: Mathabhanga. The subdivision has its headquarters at Mathabhanga.

Gram panchayats
The subdivision contains 28 gram panchayats under 3 community development blocks:

 Sitalkuchi block consists of eight gram panchayats, viz. Barokaimari, Chhotosalbari, Gosairhat, Lalbazar, Bhawerthana, Golenowhati, Khalisamari and Sitalkuchi.

 Mathabhanga I block consists of ten gram panchayats, viz. Bairagirhat, Hazrahat–II, Kursamari, Shikarpur, Gopalpur, Jorpatki, Nayarhat, Hazrahat–I, Kedarhat and Pachagarh.

 Mathabhanga II block consists of ten gram panchayats, viz. Angarkata–Pardubi, Ghoksardanga, Nishiganj–II, Unishbisha, Barasoulmari, Latapota, Premerdanga, Fulbari, Nishiganj–I and Ruidanga.

Police stations
Police stations in the Mathabhanga subdivision have the following features and jurisdiction:

Blocks
Community development blocks in the Mathabhanga subdivision are:

Education
Given in the table below (data in numbers) is a comprehensive picture of the education scenario in Cooch Behar district, with data for the year 2012-13.

Note: Primary schools include junior basic schools; middle schools, high schools and higher secondary schools include madrasahs; technical schools include junior technical schools, junior government polytechnics, industrial technical institutes, industrial training centres, nursing training institutes etc.; technical and professional colleges include engineering colleges, medical colleges, para-medical institutes, management colleges, teachers training and nursing training colleges, law colleges, art colleges, music colleges etc. Special and non-formal education centres include sishu siksha kendras, madhyamik siksha kendras, centres of Rabindra mukta vidyalaya, recognised Sanskrit tols, institutions for the blind and other handicapped persons, Anganwadi centres, reformatory schools etc.

Educational institutions
The following institutions are located in Mathabhanga subdivision:
Mathabhanga College was established in 1969 at Mathabhanga.
 Sitalkuchi College was established in 1999 at Sitalkuchi
Madhusudan Hore Mahavidyalaya was established in 2011 at Nishiganj.
Ghoksadanga Birendra Mahavidyalaya was established in 2011 at Ghoksadanga.

Healthcare
The table below (all data in numbers) presents an overview of the medical facilities available and patients treated in the hospitals, health centres and sub-centres in 2013 in Cooch Behar district, with data for the year 2012-13.: 

.* Excluding nursing homes.

Medical facilities
Medical facilities in the Mathabhanga subdivision are as follows:

Hospitals: (Name, location, beds) 
Mathabhanga Subdivisional Hospital, Mathabhanga M, 120 beds

Rural Hospitals: (Name, CD block, location, beds) 
Ghoksadanga Rural Hospital, Mathabhanga II CD block, Ghoksadanga, 30 beds
Sitalkuch Rural Hospital, Sitalkuchi CD block, Sitalkuchi, 30 beds

Block Primary Health Centres: (Name, CD block, location, beds)
Asokbari Block Primary Health Centre, Mathabhanga I CD block, PO Mathabhanga, only OPD

Primary Health Centres : (CD block-wise)(CD block, PHC location, beds)
Mathabhanga I CD block: Pakhihaga (10), Panaguri (PO Shibpur) (10)
Mathabhanga II CD block: Angarkata Paradubi (PO Paradubi) (6),  Khetifulbari (PO Fulbari) (10), Nishiganj (10)
Sitalkuchi CD block: Chotosalbari (6), Jatamari (4)

Legislative segments
As per order of the Delimitation Commission in respect of the delimitation of constituencies in the West Bengal, the Mathabhanga municipality, Mathabhanga–II block and Hazrahat–I, Hazrahat–II and Pachagarh gram panchayats of Mathabhanga–I block together will constitute the Mathabhanga assembly constituency of West Bengal. The other seven gram panchayats of Mathabhanga–I block, viz. Bairagirhat, Kursamari, Shikarpur, Gopalpur, Jorpatki, Nayarhat and Kedarhat will form the Sitalkuchi assembly constituency along with the whole area under Sitalkuchi block. Both the constituencies will be reserved for Scheduled castes (SC) candidates. Both constituencies will be part of Cooch Behar (Lok Sabha constituency), which will be reserved for SC candidates.

References

Subdivisions of West Bengal
Subdivisions in Cooch Behar district
Cooch Behar district